The Connacht Senior Hurling League is an annual inter-county hurling competition organised by the Connacht Council of the Gaelic Athletic Association (GAA) since 2022 for second and third-tier inter-county teams in the province of Connacht in Ireland. The competition runs each January.

The league provides an opportunity for the county teams to select their panel for the year and prepare for the National Hurling League (NHL).

Teams

List of finals

Roll of honour

Results

2023 competition

2022 competition

Shield

List of finals

Roll of honour

External links
 New York to compete in 2023 Connacht Hurling League
 Fixtures & Results
 2023 Connacht Hurling League fixtures announced

Hurling competitions in Connacht